TV6 is a Lithuanian terrestrial, satellite and cable television channel owned by the Nordic television company Viasat. It was launched on March 31, 2002.

TV6 focuses on entertainment and occasional but high-profile sports broadcasts (like the UEFA Champions League), comedy, sitcoms, action, science fiction and reality programmes from the RUS are popular fixtures.

TV6, as with other channels of the All Media Baltics group in the Baltic states, switched to HD broadcasting on 26 July 2018.

References

Television channels in Lithuania
TV6 Lithuania
2002 establishments in Lithuania
Television channels and stations established in 2002